Élie Semoun (born Élie Semhoun on 16 October 1963) is a French comedian, actor, director, writer and singer.

Life and career 
Élie Semoun was born in France, to a Sephardic Jewish family of Moroccan-Jewish and Algerian-Jewish descent. In 1980 at the age of 17, Semoun wrote two collections of poems and two plays. Beginning in 1988, he had regular appearances on the television series Vivement lundi! on TF1, where he played a horse mounted on rollers.

His comedy career began in 1990 with his partner Dieudonné M'bala M'bala, with whom he wrote and performed daring, skits with scathing takes generally taboo subjects such as racism and poverty, often playing up contrasts between himself and his partner in terms of origin, color, and religion.

Their first show was held at Café de la Gare in 1991. The duo acquired a certain notoriety in 1992 after several appearances on their fellow comedian Arthur's show Emission Impossible, where they were noticed for their particularly corrosive sketches. They followed this up with one success after another at Le Splendid Theater, Paris's Palais des glaces, and at Casino de Paris. Élie and Dieudonné formed one of the most popular comic duos of the 1990s.

In 1997 the duo split due to artistic and financial differences. Élie resented how Dieudonné handled their relations with the media and admitted that he was unhappy that his friend had turned towards film (and that he left to appear in the United States) and antisemitism. Dieudonné managed the financial aspects of their career, and Semoun felt their money was not divided equitably.

Breaking out on his own, Semoun continued his success with Petites Annonces d'Élie (which had been at first intended to be a show with Dieudonné) alongside his friend the actor Franck Dubosc. Once again his performance was promoted by his friend on the show Les Enfants de la télé (France)  Inspired by actual classified ads recorded by them in a van, the "Petites Annonces d'Élie" (Élie's Classified Ads) are seen through the character of Cyprian, a repulsive looking man searching for a "busty blond".

Semoun went back on stage with a one-man show, Élie and Semoun. He supported Bertrand Delanoë during Paris's municipal elections of 2001 and Lionel Jospin during the presidential election of 2002. In 2003, he released an album of French songs called simply "Chansons". In early 2005, he performed in a show (co-authored with Franck Dubosc and Muriel Robin entitled Élie Semoun se prend pour qui?

Élie Semoun maintained in the years following his separation with Dieudonné a complex and strained relationship with his former partner. First strained, then reconciled, they have again grown apart during the public controversy aroused by the political stances of Dieudonné. "Some have speculated on the reunion of our duo, but I must tell you that this is clearly out of the question! It's over." In 2012, he declared that "the Dieudonné he knew and the Dieudonné of today appear to him like two completely different people, and he is unable to reconcile them in his mind".

An album entitled Sur le fil (On the Edge), was released on 19 March 2007. He brought in new guest stars, such as Alexandre Astier and Bérénice Bejo. The skits are always written by Élie Semoun and Franck Dubosc, but this time assisted by comedian Manu Payet.

Élie performed his show Élie Semoun se prend pour qui? for the last time on 16 June 2007 in Doué-la-Fontaine at the Festival d'Anjou.

In 2007, he signed a petition disagreeing with Ségolène Royal and participated in several meetings against the Socialist candidate with his friend Bertrand Delanoë.

Family 
His father, Paul Semhoun, is from the Moroccan city of Taza, and worked for the French Postal Service. His mother, Denise Malka, born in Tlemcen in Algeria, was a French teacher. She died of hepatitis at age 36 when Élie was 11 years old. He has a younger brother, Laurent, who died of AIDS in 2002, also age 36, and a sister, Anne-Judith, a marketing director.

He has a son, Antoine, born in 1995 in Rennes. He shares custody with his ex-wife, Annie Florence Jeannesson, whom he divorced in 2002

Semoun is the second cousin of singer and actor Patrick Bruel, the grandfather of Bruel being the brother of Semoun's grandmother.

Shows
1991: Élie Semoun et Dieudonné au Théâtre du Splendid Saint-Martin, directed by Pascal Légitimus
1996: Élie Semoun et Dieudonné en garde à vue
1999: Élie et Semoun au Palais des Glaces, directed by Muriel Robin
2002: Élie Semoun à l'Olympia, directed by Roger Louret
2005–2006: Élie Semoun se prend pour qui ?, directed by Roger Louret
2008–2009: Merki…, directed by Roger Louret
2012: Tranches de Vies, directed by Muriel Robin

Theater
2012: Tartarin de Tarascon by Jérôme Savary, directed by the author, Théâtre André Malraux
2012: Inconnu à cette adresse by Kressmann Taylor, directed by Delphine de Malherbe, théâtre Antoine-Simone Berriau
2014: Le Placard by Francis Veber, directed by the author, Théâtre des Nouveautés

Filmography

Television 

1989: Pause-café Pause Tendresse de Serge Leroy (3rd episode): Alberto
1988–1991: Vivement lundi!
1990: Édouard et ses filles by Michel Lang
1996: François Kleber – L'Embrouilleur
1996: Maigret – Maigret tend un piège
2001–2003: Caméra Café (at least 3 episodes)
2002: Si j'étais lui by Philippe Triboit
2004: Kaamelott (5 episodes)
2008: Rien dans les poches by Marion Vernoux
2010: Un divorce de chien by Lorraine Lévy : Julien
2011: Very Bad Blagues de Palmashow (épisode 58)
2012: Bref by Kyan Khojandi (episode 53)
2013: Hitchcock by Mocky – episode "Selon la loi"
2013: Nos chers voisins fêtent l'été : Ludovic, un représentant de commerce, victime de la ruse des voisins
2013: Y'a pas d'âge  (1 episode)
2013: What Ze Teuf (2 episodes) : lui-même

Film

1988: Toilette-Zone by Laurence Arcadias
1995: Les Trois Frères by Bernard Campan and Didier Bourdon : Brice
1995: Les Bidochon by Serge Korber : René
1996: Titus et Cortex by Jean Claude Buziac
1996: Tout doit disparaître by Philippe Muyl: Gérard Piche
1997: Les Démons de Jésus by Bernie Bonvoisin: Gérard
1997: Le Clone by Fabio Conversi: Thomas
1997: Que la lumière soit by Arthur Joffé: God the shopkeeper
1998: Charité biz'ness by Thierry Barthes: Momo/Massipu
1998: Les Grandes Bouches by Bernie Bonvoisin: Fichier
1999: L'Ami du jardin by Jean-Louis Bouchaud
1999: Les Parasites by Philippe de Chauveron: Brigadier Max Schmitt
1999: Love Me by Laetitia Masson: l'amoureux
1999: Stringer by Klaus Biedermann: Filo
2000: Old School by Karim Abbou and Kader Ayd: Dealer
2000: Deuxième vie by Patrick Braoudé: Steve Michaud
2002: Si j'étais lui by Philippe Triboit: Tristan
2003: The Car Keys by Laurent Baffie: Himself
2004: People by Fabien Onteniente: Cyril Legall
2004: Casablanca Driver by Maurice Barthélémy: Mr. X
2004: Les Dalton by Philippe Haim: Docteur Doxey / Customs Officer
2004: La vie de Michel Muller est plus belle que la vôtre by Michel Muller
2005: Iznogoud by Patrick Braoudé: Prince
2005: Once Upon a Time in the Oued by Djamel Bensalah: Maitre d'hôtel
2005: Riviera by Anne Villacèque: Romansky
2005: Aux abois by Philippe Collin: Paul
2008: Asterix at the Olympic Games by Frédéric Forestier and Thomas Langmann : Judge Omega
2008: 15 ans et demi by Thomas Sorriaux and François Desagnat: Angry Automobilist
2009: Cyprien by David Charhon: Cyprien
2009: Park Benches by Bruno Podalydès: Le dragueur
2009: Neuilly sa mère ! by Gabriel Julien-Laferrière: Court Bailiff
2010: La Chance de ma vie by Nicolas Cuche: Philippe Markus
2011: L'Élève Ducobu by Philippe de Chauveron: Gustave Latouche
2012: Les Vacances de Ducobu by Philippe de Chauveron: Gustave Latouche
2012: Les Kaïra by Franck Gastambide: lui-même
2014: Les Trois Frères : le retour by Didier Bourdon and Bernard Campan: Mr Gérard
2014: Les Francis by Fabrice Begotti: Prefect
2014: Qu'est-ce qu'on a fait au Bon Dieu? by Philippe de Chauveron
2014: La Grande séduction by Stéphane Meunier
2018: Neuilly sa mère, sa mère ! by Gabriel Julien-Laferrière
2020: Ducobu 3: Gustave Latouche
2022: Ducobu Président!: Gustave Latouche

Short films
1985: Poussière d'étoiles by Agnès Merlet
2000: Le Truc by Stéphane Bélaïsch
2007: Dominique Laffin, portrait d'une enfant pas sage, by Laurent Perrin
2012: L'âge de Glace 4: Élie Semoun visite Blue Sky; (document shown Sunday 24 juin 2012 by Gulli).
2014: Les Trois Frères, le retour

Voice Work

Film

Animated Films
1992: Old School: French voice of Mitchell Whitfield
1995: Pocahontas: French voice of Wiggins
2002: The Magic Roundabout directed by Dave Borthwick: voice of Zébulon
2002: Ice Age directed by Chris Wedge: French voice of Sid
2002: Gouille et Gar by Gamer (short film): voice of Gouille
2005: Robots of Chris Wedge: French voice of Fender
2006: Ice Age: The Meltdown directed by Carlos Saldanha: French voice of Sid
2006: Charlotte's Web directed by Gary Winick: French voice of Rat Templeton
2009: Ice Age: Dawn of the Dinosaurs: French voice of Sid
2010: A Turtle's Tale: Sammy's Adventures: French voice of adult Ray
2010: Allez raconte ! directed by Jean-Christophe Roger: Éric
2011: Animals United: French voice of Billy the Meerkat
2011: Émilie Jolie directed by Francis Nielsen and Philippe Chatel: voices of Belzébuth and Prince Charming
2012: Ice Age: Continental Drift : French voice of Sid
2012: Sammy's Great Escape directed by Ben Stassen : French voice of adult Ray
2014: The Mansions of the Gods directed by Alexandre Astier : voice of the chief of the Roman cohort
2016: Ice Age: Collision Course: French voice of Sid

Television

Series 
1988: Les Années collège : Joey Jeremiah (Pat Mastroianni)

Shows with Dieudonné 
1991–1993: Élie et Dieudonné
1993: L'avis des bêtes - Une certaine idée de la France
1996: Élie et Dieudonné en garde à vue

Shows with Franck Dubosc 
Les Petites Annonces d'Élie
Élie Annonce Semoun 2000
Élie Annonce Semoun : la suite de La suite

Video 
1999: Élie et Semoun au Palais des Glaces
2000: Élie annonce Semoun, 5th volume of short ads (55 classified ads)
2002: Les Petites Annonces d'Élie l'intégrale, the first 3 volumes released on VHS in the late 1990s and the unprecedented volume 4 (the best of the first 3) (167 classified ads)
2002 : Élie Semoun à l'Olympia Bruno Coquatrix
2003 : Élie annonce Semoun, la suite, 6th volume of classified ads
2006 : Élie Semoun se prend pour qui ?
2007 : Élie annonce Semoun, la suite de la suite, 7th volume of classified ads (56 classified ads)
2008 : Merki
2008 : Les Petites Annonces d'Élie (l'essentiel){Avec Franck Dubosc}(more than160 classified ads)
2012 : Tranches de vies

Video Games 
1998 : Dreamcast (voiceover promotional advertising Sega console "Up to six billion players")
2003 : Rayman 3: Hoodlum Havoc (Les Ptizêtres, additional voices)

Albums 
2003 : Chansons
2007 : Sur le fil

Books 
Les Annonces en BD, bande dessinée, Jungle :
Tome I, Si tu es blonde…, 2004.
Tome II, J'suis choooquée, 2005.
Best of 2009.
Élie Semoun se prend pour qui ?, graphic novel, Jungle, 2006.
Kévina, Mikeline, Toufik et les autres…, Fetjaine, 2008.
Je grandirai plus tard, Flammarion, 2013.

References

External links 

 

1963 births
Living people
People from Antony, Hauts-de-Seine
French comedians
French male television actors
French male singers
20th-century French male actors
21st-century French male actors
French humorists
20th-century French Sephardi Jews
French male film actors
French male voice actors
French male writers